Cedar Island Wildlife Management Area is a Wildlife Management Area in Somerset County, Maryland near Crisfield. The area is almost  in extent on Tangier Sound in Chesapeake Bay. The area was primarily established to protect black duck habitat and is notable for its concentration of the species.

References

External links
 Cedar Island Wildlife Management Area

Wildlife management areas of Maryland
Protected areas of Somerset County, Maryland
IUCN Category V